The Princess Switch film series consists of American Christmas romantic-comedies, including three feature films. Starring Vanessa Hudgens in multiple roles, alongside Sam Palladio and Nick Sagar, the plot is based loosely on the 1881 novel The Prince and the Pauper by Mark Twain. Hudgens stars as Stacy De Novo and Lady Margaret Delacourt Dutchess of Montenero, two strangers who discover that they look exactly alike and decide to trade places and roles for Christmas. The films show their experiences while doing so, while Hudgens additionally portrays Lady Fiona Pembroke in the sequels.

The series is produced by Netflix and released exclusively through its streaming services as Netflix Original Films. The first film, released in 2018 was received with positive critical reception. Following its success, Netflix quickly began developing sequels. The second was released in 2020, to mixed critical reception. The third film The Princess Switch 3: Romancing the Star, was released November 2021.

Films

The Princess Switch (2018)

Stacy DeNovo, a talented young baker, with a type-A personality with a habit of planning and creating schedules, takes a spontaneous trip during Christmastime at the suggestion of her sous-chef and best friend, named Kevin. Upon arriving in Belgravia, Stacy commences enjoying the holiday festivities. While preparing for the local Royal Christmas Baking Contest, she meets her identical doppelgänger who has a personal request. Lady Margaret Delacourt, who serves as Duchess of Montenaro, a free-willed and spirited woman with obligations to her position of power, asks that the pair change places for the event so that she can enjoy her last chance at normalcy before accepting her bethrothal to the Crown Prince of Belgravia. When the women swap roles, they soon discover that their interests lie with each other's respective men.

The Princess Switch: Switched Again (2020)

Following unexpected events, Lady Margaret Delacourt inherits the throne to the kingdom of Montenaro. As she struggles with her new responsibilities and duties as Queen, a series of cumbersome events convince her that she needs help from her look-alike friend Stacy DeNavo. Longing to spend time with Kevin who she met while previously living as Stacy, she asks Stacy to once again switch places with her. As the women trade positions and assume their roles in impersonating each other, Lady Margaret's party-life cousin named Lady Fiona Pembroke, who also looks remarkably like the two other women, comes to visit Montenaro for the Christmas season. The three women are involved in a comedic series of events, while trying to gain control of their respective love lives.

The Princess Switch 3: Romancing the Star (2021)

Once again during Christmas preparations, a priceless heirloom of the kingdom of Montenaro is stolen. Queen Margaret and Princess Stacy work together, with the help of Fiona and her ex-boyfriend, to retrieve the relic. While each of the women trade places, events of adventure and romance ensue.

Main cast and characters

Additional production and crew details

Critical reception

References 

American film series
American romantic comedy films